Amanda Françozo (born July 7, 1979) is a Brazilian television presenter and model. Since 2007, she has presented the chat show Papo De Amigos on the Rede Gazeta television network based in São Paulo. She is also an exponent of Carnaval Samba dancing, and in 2008 and 2009 was appointed Madrinha da Bateria (Godmother of the Percussion) for the Vai-Vai samba school.

References

External links
 Papo De Amigos official website (Portuguese)

Living people
1979 births
Brazilian television personalities
Brazilian television presenters
Brazilian female models
People from São Paulo (state)
Brazilian women television presenters